The Poland national under-19 speedway team is the national under-19 motorcycle speedway team of Poland and is controlled by the Polish Motor Union (PZM). The team has won the Team Speedway Junior European Championship twice in 2009 and 2010. In the Individual competition was won by Poles six times: Rafał Okoniewski (1998, 1999), Łukasz Romanek (2001), Karol Ząbik (2005), Artur Mroczka (2008) and Przemysław Pawlicki (2009).

Competition

Riders 
Riders who started in the Individual Speedway Junior European Championship Finals:

 Rafał Okoniewski (1998 - 1st, 1999 - 1st)
 Karol Ząbik (2004 - 2nd, 2005 - 1st)
 Przemysław Pawlicki (2009 - 1st, 2010 - 2nd)
 Łukasz Romanek (2001 - 1st, 2002 - 16th)
 Artur Mroczka (2008 - 1st)
 Maciej Janowski (2008 - 2nd, 2009 - 2nd)
 Karol Malecha (1999 - 2nd)
 Rafał Kurmański (2001 - 2nd)
 Janusz Kołodziej (2003 - 2nd)
 Jarosław Hampel (1999 - 3rd)
 Patryk Dudek (2009 - 5th, 2010 - 3rd)
 Zbigniew Czerwiński (2000 - 3rd, 2001 - 6th)
 Paweł Hlib (2003 - 11th, 2004 - 7th, 2005 - 4th)
 Tomasz Chrzanowski (1998 - 12th, 1999 - 4th)
 Borys Miturski (2007 - 4th, 2008 - 14th)
 Krzysztof Cegielski (1998 - 4th)
 Marek Cieślewicz (2002 - 4th)
 Adrian Gomólski (2006 - 4th)
 Krzysztof Kasprzak (2001 - 10th, 2002 - 5th)
 Marcin Rempała (2003 - 5th)
 Emil Pulczyński (2010 - 5th)
 Krzysztof Buczkowski (2003 - 12th, 2004 - 9th, 2005 - 6th)
 Mirosław Jabłoński (2003 - 6th, 2004 - 14th)
 Sławomir Musielak (2009 - 6th)
 Mariusz Węgrzyk (1998 - 7th)
 Marcin Jędrzejewski (2005 - 18th, 2006 - 8th)
 Krzysztof Mikuta (1999 - 8th)
 Robert Miśkowiak (2002 - 8th)
 Tobiasz Musielak (2010 - 8th)
 Dawid Lampart (2008 - 11th, 2009 - 9th)
 Andrzej Zieja (1999 - 9th)
 Łukasz Pawlikowski (2000 - 9th)
 Adam Kajoch (2007 - 9th)
 Łukasz Cyran (2010 - 9th)
 Sebastian Smoter (1998 - 10th, 2000 - 10th)
 Grzegorz Zengota (2007 - 10th)
 Paweł Duszyński (1998 - 11th)
 Mateusz Szczepaniak (2006 - 11th)
 Łukasz Stanisławski (2000 - 17th, 2001 - 12th)
 Piotr Świderski (2002 - 12th)
 Tomasz Kwiatkowski (2000 - 12th)
 Adrian Miedziński (2003 - 15th, 2004 - 13th)
 Kacper Gomólski (2009 - reserve, 2010 - 13th)
 Marcel Kajzer (2008 - 13th)
 Patryk Pawłaszczyk (2005 - 13th)
 Sławomir Dąbrowski (2006 - 14th)
 Mateusz Łukaszewski (2010 - 15th)
 Maciej Piaszczyński (2007 - 16th)
 Michał Aszenberg (2000 - 18th)
 Sebastian Brucheiser (2006 - reserve)

See also 
 Speedway in Poland
 Poland national speedway team
 Poland national under-21 speedway team

External links 
 (pl) Poland national team webside

National speedway teams
Speedway

!